Banca di Legnano was an Italian bank based in Legnano, Lombardy. The bank was absorbed into the parent company Banca Popolare di Milano in 2013.

History
Banca di Legnano was a subsidiary of Banca Commerciale Italiana (BCI) for 55% shares. In 1999, BCI merged with Banca Intesa to form the Intesa–BCI group. On 1 January 2001 Banca Popolare di Milano (BPM) acquired all 55% shares from Intesa, for 1,300 billion lire. It also triggered a public offer to buy the remain shares. In 2002 BPM owned 100% shares of Banca di Legnano. In 2007, BPM was the owner of the bank for 93.51% shares, with the rest owned by Crédit Industriel et Commercial (CIC) for 6.49%, which was acquired in 2004. In 2011 BPM acquired the remaining 6.49% shares for €100 million.

In 2012 Cassa di Risparmio di Alessandria was absorbed into Banca di Legnano. In the next year Banca di Legnano was absorbed into BPM on 14 September. On 31 December 2012 the bank had a shareholders equity of €960 million.

Sponsorship
The bank was a sponsor of Coppa Bernocchi.

References

External links
 http://www.borsaitaliana.it/bitApp/home.bit?lang=it&page=1&c_ndg=29&target=SocQuotateBilrel

Banks established in 1887
Italian companies established in 1887
Banks disestablished in 2013
Italian companies disestablished in 2013
Defunct banks of Italy
Companies based in Lombardy
Legnano
Banca Popolare di Milano